Valles Caldera (or Jemez Caldera) is a  wide volcanic caldera in the Jemez Mountains of northern New Mexico.  Hot springs, streams, fumaroles, natural gas seeps and volcanic domes dot the caldera floor landscape. The highest point in the caldera is Redondo Peak, an  resurgent lava dome located entirely within the caldera. Also within the caldera are several grass valleys, or valles, the largest of which is Valle Grande, the only one accessible by a paved road. In 1975, Valles Caldera was designated as a National Natural Landmark by the National Park Service with much of the caldera being within the Valles Caldera National Preserve, a unit of the National Park System.

History
Use of Valles Caldera dates back to the prehistoric times: spear points dating to 11,000 years ago have been discovered. Several Native American tribes frequented the caldera, often seasonally, for hunting and for obsidian, used for spear and arrow points. Obsidian from the caldera was traded by tribes across much of the Southwest. Eventually, Spanish and later Mexican settlers as well as the Navajo and other tribes came to the caldera seasonally for grazing with periodic clashes and raids.  Later, as the United States acquired New Mexico as part of the Treaty of Guadalupe Hidalgo in 1848, the caldera became the backdrop for the Indian wars with the U.S. Army. Around the same time, the caldera and its forest began to be used commercially for  ranching and logging.

Baca Ranch
The caldera became part of the Baca Ranch in 1876. The Bacas were a wealthy family given the land as compensation for the termination of a grant given to their family near Las Vegas, in northeastern New Mexico. The family was given several other parcels by the US Government as well, including one in Arizona. This area, was called Baca Location number one. Since then, the land has been through a string of exchanges between private owners and business enterprises. Most notably, it was owned by Frank Bond in the 1930s. Mr. Bond, a businessman based in nearby Española, ran up to 30,000 sheep in the calderas, significantly overgrazing the land and causing damage from which the watersheds of the property are still recovering.

The land was purchased by the Dunigan family from Abilene, Texas in 1963. Pat Dunigan did not obtain the timber rights, however, and the New Mexico Lumber Company logged the property very heavily, leaving the land scarred with roads and removing significant amounts of old-growth douglas fir and ponderosa pine. Mr. Dunigan bought out the timber rights in the 1970s and slowed the logging. He negotiated unsuccessfully with the National Park Service and the US Forest Service for possible sale of the property in the 1980s.

Valles Caldera National Preserve
The Valles Caldera Preservation Act of 2000 signed by President Clinton on July 25, 2000, created the Valles Caldera National Preserve (VCNP). The legislation provided for the federal purchase of this historical ranch nestled inside a volcanic caldera, with funds coming from the Land and Water Conservation Fund derived from royalties the US government receives from offshore petroleum and natural gas drilling. As some sites of the Baca Ranch are sacred and of cultural significance to the Native Americans,  of the purchase were obtained by the Santa Clara Pueblo, which borders the property to the northeast. This include the headwaters of Santa Clara Creek that is sacred to the pueblo. On the southwest corner of the land  were to be ceded to Bandelier National Monument.

The Baca Ranch, also known as Baca Location No. 1, had possessed a mixed range of tree species and significant biodiversity. The preserve is encircled by federal lands, including the Santa Fe National Forest, the Jemez National Recreation Area and Bandelier National Monument.

The Valles Caldera Preservation Act of 2000 also created the Valles Caldera Trust, an experimental management organization consisting of nine board members including seven appointed by the President of the United States. The Trust combined private-sector practices with federal land management protocol. Under the terms of the Valles Caldera Preservation Act, the preserve was to become financially self-sustaining by 2015. The experiment was controversial. In 2010 the Trust admitted that it would be unable to achieve financial self-sustainability, having raised only about $850,000 of the $3 million needed to manage the property each year.

Environmentalists had lobbied for the more inclusive protections of national park status instead of the Trust model, but then-Senator Pete Domenici (R) insisted on the experimental approach as a condition for his support for public purchase. Beginning in 2010, US Senator Jeff Bingaman (D) introduced legislation that would transfer the property to the National Park Service as a national preserve. The 2011 bill was supported by the VCNP trustees and a majority of New Mexico's Congressional delegation. On December 19, 2014, President Barack Obama signed the 2015 National Defense Authorization Act, which transferred administrative jurisdiction of the preserve from the Valles Caldera Trust to the National Park Service. After a brief transition period, the National Park Service assumed day-to-day management on October 1, 2015. On October 10, the preserve held an official dedication with dignitaries including U.S. Secretary of the Interior Sally Jewell, U.S. Senator Tom Udall, U.S. Senator Martin Heinrich, former-U.S. Senator Jeff Bingaman, National Park Service Intermountain Region Director Sue Masica, and the first National Park Service Superintendent of Valles Caldera National Preserve, Jorge Silva-Bañuelos.

2011 wildfire
In July 2011, the Las Conchas Fire, started by a power line on nearby private land, burned  of the Valles Caldera National Preserve.

Geology and science

The circular topographic rim of the caldera measures  in diameter.  The caldera and surrounding volcanic structures are one of the most thoroughly studied caldera complexes in the United States.  Research studies have concerned the fundamental processes of magmatism, hydrothermal systems, and ore deposition. Nearly 40 deep cores have been examined, resulting in extensive subsurface data.

Valles Caldera is the younger of two calderas known at this location, having collapsed over and buried the older Toledo Caldera, which in turn may have collapsed over yet older calderas.  The associated Cerros del Rio volcanic field, which forms the eastern Pajarito Plateau and the Caja del Rio, is older than the Toledo Caldera. The Toledo and Valles Calderas formed during eruptions 1.61 million and 1.25 million years ago, respectively. The caldera-forming Toledo eruption emplaced the Otowi member of the Bandelier Tuff 1.61 million years ago, which can be seen along canyon walls west of Valles Caldera, including San Diego Canyon. The younger Tshirege Member of the Bandelier Tuff was formed during the Valles Caldera eruption 1.23 million years ago. The now eroded and exposed orange-tan, light-colored Bandelier Tuff from these events creates the stunning mesas of the Pajarito Plateau.

Valles Caldera is the type locality for a resurgent dome caldera, the formation of which was first developed by C.S. Ross, R.L. Smith, and R.A. Bailey during field work at Valles in the 1960s. After the initial caldera-forming eruption at Valles, the Redondo Peak resurgent dome was uplifted beginning around 1.2 million years ago. Eruption of moat rhyolitic lava domes occurred from approximately 1.16 million years ago at Cerro del Medio to 0.07 million years ago at Banco Bonito, along a structural ring fracture zone. The El Cajete Pumice and Battleship Rock Ignimbrite were emplaced in a single eruptive event 74,200 ± 1,100 years ago, followed by the eruption of the Banco Bonito obsidian flow during the youngest eruption of Valles Caldera, at 68,900 ± 1,000 years ago. The caldera and surrounding area continue to be shaped by ongoing volcanic activity. Seismic investigations show that a low-velocity zone lies beneath the caldera, suggesting the presence of partial melt within a remaining magma chamber at between 5 and 15 km depth. An active geothermal system with hot springs and fumaroles exists today. These calderas and associated volcanic structures lie within the Jemez Volcanic Field.  This volcanic field lies at the intersection of the Rio Grande Rift, which runs north–south through New Mexico, and the Jemez Lineament, which extends from southeastern Arizona northeast to western Oklahoma. The volcanic activity here is related to the tectonic movements of this intersection.

NASA used the caldera in October to November 1964 and again in September 1966 to geologically train the Apollo Astronauts in recognizing volcanic features, such as ash flow tuffs, pumice air falls, and rhyolite domes.  Notable geologist instructors included Roy Bailey.

Climate
According to the Köppen climate classification, Valles Caldera has a subarctic climate (Dfc), with cold winters and mild summers. The caldera is subject to strong temperature inversions, causing very cold nights year round and high diurnal temperature variation.

Geothermal energy source potential
The volcanic properties of Valles Caldera make it a likely source for renewable and nonpolluting geothermal energy.  However, some people oppose the development of geothermal energy, considering it destructive to its scenic beauty, recreational and grazing use. Its impact on the hot springs and supplying aquifers is unknown as experiences from other past geothermal projects proved that production of reservoir fluids had dramatic impacts to the surface thermal features.

Valles caldera was home to the first experiments into development of an Enhanced geothermal system (EGS) or Hot-dry-rock (HDR) geothermal system, beginning in 1974 by the Los Alamos National Laboratory at the Fenton Hill reservoir, approximately 3 km west of Valles caldera. Originally, the Fenton Hill site was chosen as an EGS laboratory in hopes that the proximity to Valles caldera would increase the temperature of the bedrock, thus requiring shallower drill depths. However, the abundance of hydrothermal fluids discharged from the nearby caldera resulted in hydrothermal alteration of the rocks at depth, weakening the sealed nature of the reservoir. The Fenton Hill HDR experiment was finally abandoned in 1998. The experiments demonstrated that a potential EGS reservoir must be characterized by low permeability, crystalline basement rock with no active faults or joints.

From 1959 to 1983, approximately 40 exploratory geothermal wells were drilled into the Redondo Creek Graben as part of the Baca geothermal field, a joint operation by the United States Department of Energy and the Union Oil Company of California. Despite measuring a maximum temperature of 342 °C and having a likely production capacity of 20 MWe, the geothermal field was too small to be economic. Three scientific cores were drilled in Valles Caldera during the mid-1980s as part of the United States Continental Scientific Drilling Program in order to analyze the chemistry of geothermal fluids and the presence of a vapor-dominated cap in the Sulphur Springs region. The maximum bottom hole temperature measured during drilling was 295 °C. Overall, the geothermal reservoir at Valles Caldera is liquid-dominated rather than vapor-dominated and has a neutral-chloride fluid chemistry with a maximum temperature below 300 °C.

Recreation

A number of recreational and/or historical uses take place in Valles Caldera.  Many of these uses involve trails.  Over two dozen official hiking and biking trails of varying length are available. Maps and trail descriptions may be found in "Hiking Trails in Valles Caldera National Preserve," by Coco Rae. Valles Caldera has many miles of ranch roads, livestock and game trails.  These include a network of trails currently designated for horse riding.  Historically, Valles Caldera was a location for equestrian endurance races.  After establishment of VCNP, the first race in the caldera was held in 2009.  The largest grass valley, Valle Grande, is a venue for ski orienteering.  Activities are open to the public, though some require reservations. Customer service and concierge services are provided by the Public Lands Interpretive Association. The valley floor is above  altitude.

Wildlife and livestock
Throughout the caldera, the grass valleys appear groomed:  there are few saplings and mature trees lack lower branches.  This is due to heavy browsing by elk and cattle and because of frequent grass fires of human and natural origin which kill the lower branches on the Engelmann spruce, Douglas-fir and Ponderosa pine that populate the uplands around the grasslands dominating the bottoms of the calderas. Extreme cold in winter prevents tree growth in the bottoms of the calderas. The grasslands were native perennial bunch grass maintained by frequent fire before sheep and cattle grazing. Although the grass appears abundant, it is a limited resource.  Its growing season is short.  Through the VCNP's limited grazing program, it feeds hundreds of cattle in the summer and thousands more of elk in the warm seasons and in drought winters, and during most of the year.  Its nutritional value is low.

In popular culture 

Valles Caldera has provided several filming locations, most for films in the Western genre.  Some of these locations include exterior sets, such as the weathered "ranch house" that can be seen from the highway in Valle Grande, and a small "town".

 1971 Shoot Out
 1977 Peter Lundy and the Medicine Hat Stallion (TV)
 1982 The Gambler (TV)
 1994 Troublemakers
 1995 Buffalo Girls (TV)
 1997 Last Stand at Saber River (TV)
 2003 The Missing
 2007 Seraphim Falls
 2010 Kites (film) (Hindi/Indian Film)
 2013 The Lone Ranger
 2012-2017 Longmire (TV series)

See also 
 Jemez Pueblo, New Mexico
 Valle Vidal

Notes

Further reading
Fraser Goff, Valles Caldera: A Geologic History.  2009, University of New Mexico Press. . Review at New Mexico Magazine: "No matter your interest in the Valles Caldera, you’ll learn something new in Fraser Goff’s new book."
Coco Rae, "Hiking Trails in Valles Caldera National Preserve". 2020. The complete trail guide to VCNP.

External links

 Valles Caldera National Preserve, official website
 The Physics Institute of Brazil's Valles Caldera website (English)
 Geologic travel guide from American Geological Institute
 Caldera Action, advocacy organization
 

VEI-7 volcanoes
Rift volcanoes
Jemez Mountains
Volcanoes of New Mexico
Calderas of New Mexico
Complex volcanoes
Pleistocene calderas
National Natural Landmarks in New Mexico
Santa Fe National Forest
Landforms of Rio Arriba County, New Mexico
Landforms of Sandoval County, New Mexico